The fencing competition at the 2018 Central American and Caribbean Games was held in Barranquilla, Colombia from 28 July to 2 August at the Centro Eventos Puerta de Oro.

Medal summary

Men's events

Women's events

Medal table

References

External links
2018 Central American and Caribbean Games – Fencing

2018 Central American and Caribbean Games events
Central American and Caribbean Games
2018